Caldwell is an unincorporated community in Greenbrier County, West Virginia, United States. The population was 489 at the 2020 Census. Caldwell has a post office with ZIP code 24925.

The community has the name of James R. Caldwell, the original owner of the town site.

References

Unincorporated communities in Greenbrier County, West Virginia
Unincorporated communities in West Virginia